This is a list of prisons and jails in the U.S. state of Oregon. The incomplete list includes all local, state, federal, and any other detention facilities.

Federal prisons
 Federal Correctional Institution, Sheridan (1,350 medium security, 480 minimum security)

State prisons

 Coffee Creek Correctional Facility, Wilsonville (1,685 inmate capacity)
 Columbia River Correctional Institution, Portland (595 inmate capacity)
 Deer Ridge Correctional Institution, Madras (1,867 inmate capacity)
 Eastern Oregon Correctional Institution, Pendleton (1,659 inmate capacity)
 Mill Creek Correctional Facility, Salem (290 inmate capacity) (closed July 2021)
 Oregon State Correctional Institution, Salem (880 inmate capacity)
 Oregon State Penitentiary, Salem (2,194 inmate capacity)
 Powder River Correctional Facility, Baker City (366 inmate capacity)
 Santiam Correctional Institution, Salem (440 inmate capacity)
 Shutter Creek Correctional Institution, North Bend (260 inmate capacity) (closed December 2021)
 South Fork Forest Camp, Tillamook (200 inmate capacity)
 Snake River Correctional Institution, Ontario (3,050 inmate capacity)
 Two Rivers Correctional Institution, Umatilla (1,878 inmate capacity)
 Warner Creek Correctional Facility, Lakeview (496 inmate capacity)

Youth correctional facilities
Male
 Eastern Oregon Youth Correctional Facility, Burns (50 beds)
 MacLaren Youth Correctional Facility, Woodburn (271 beds)
 North Coast Youth Correctional Facility, Warrenton (50 beds)
 Rogue Valley Youth Correctional Facility, Grants Pass (100 beds)
 Tillamook Youth Correctional Facility, Tillamook County (50 beds)
 Oak Creek Youth Correctional Facility, Albany (75 beds)

See also 
 Lists of Oregon-related topics
 List of U.S. state prisons
 List of U.S. federal prisons
 Oregon Department of Corrections

References

External links

 Oregon Department of Corrections: Oregon Prisons
 OYA Facility Services - Oregon Youth Authority

 
Prisons
Oregon